Krishna Kumar  is an Indian politician. He was elected to the Bihar Legislative Assembly from Banmankhi in the 2015 Bihar Legislative Assembly election as a member of the Bharatiya Janata Party. He is Minister of Tourism in Nitish Kumar cabinet from 2017.

References

1976 births
Living people
People from Purnia district
Bharatiya Janata Party politicians from Bihar
Bihar MLAs 2020–2025